Sadam bin Hashim (born 11 August 1992) is a Malaysian footballer who plays as a midfielder for Felda United.

References

External links
 

1992 births
Living people
Malaysian footballers
UiTM FC players
Felda United F.C. players
Malaysia Premier League players
Malaysia Super League players
Association football midfielders